Agapanthia lateralis is a species of beetle in the family Cerambycidae. It was described by Ludwig Ganglbauer in 1883.

References

lateralis
Beetles described in 1883